George Washington Farson III (December 29, 1939 – October 10, 2010) was an American professional baseball player, manager, coach and scout. A catcher, the native of Lynchburg, Virginia, played ten seasons (1962–1971) of minor league baseball in the Baltimore Orioles' organization before pursuing an off-field baseball career that would last through 1989.

Farson signed with the Orioles after attending Spring Garden High School and the University of Virginia. During his 718-game minor league career, which included 125 games with the Triple-A Rochester Red Wings, Farson batted .236 with 38 home runs.  His managing career lasted for eight seasons in the Baltimore, Oakland Athletics and Milwaukee Brewers systems, including three seasons at the Double-A level.

In 1980 he joined the Philadelphia Phillies as a minor league catching instructor. After two seasons, he spent eight years (1982–1989) as a Phillie scout.  A resident of Vernon Hill, Virginia, Farson also was an avid grouse hunter in Maine. He died in Fort Kent in October 2010 at the age of 70.

References

External links

1939 births
2010 deaths
Aberdeen Pheasants players
Baseball players from Virginia
Bluefield Orioles players
Chattanooga Lookouts managers
Elmira Pioneers players
Fox Cities Foxes players
People from Halifax County, Virginia
Philadelphia Phillies scouts
Rochester Red Wings players
Tri-City Atoms players
University of Virginia alumni
Virginia Cavaliers baseball players
People from Fort Kent, Maine
People from Lynchburg, Virginia